WVRM is an American grindcore band from Greenville, South Carolina.

History
The band formed in 2013.

Discography
Studio Albums
 Despair (2013)
 Where All Light Dies (2014)
 Swarm Sound (2014)
 Heartache (2016)
 Colony Collapse (2020)

EPs
 S//T (2015)

Splits
 WVRM / Self Harm Split (2016)

References

American grindcore musical groups
American death metal musical groups
American crust and d-beat groups
Deathgrind musical groups
Hardcore punk groups from South Carolina